Jayli Wolf (born 23 November) is a Canadian singer-songwriter, actress, and filmmaker. She began her music career in collaboration with Hayden Wolf under the name Once A Tree. As a solo artist, she broke out with her single and music video "Child of the Government", which made CBC Music's top 10 Canadian songs of 2021 and won Best Music Video at the Venice Short Film Awards.

For her debut solo EP Wild Whisper, Wolf was nominated for Contemporary Indigenous Artist of the Year at the Juno Awards of 2022. She was nominated for Best Supporting Actress at the American Indian Film Festival for her performance in the film Run Woman Run (2021).

Early and personal life
Wolf was born in Creston, British Columbia to a teen mother of Danish descent and raised in a trailer with her maternal family. She was told she was half-Mexican growing up, only to learn she was First Nations at the age of eight. Her father reached out to her with the discovery that he was unwittingly taken in the Sixties Scoop and had his ethnicity covered up on his adoption papers. He found his family in the Saulteau community near Chetwynd.

Wolf is bisexual. She grew up a Jehovah's Witness in what she has described as a Doomsday cult. She convinced her collaborator Hayden Wolf, whom she met online through mutual friends, to join her in leaving the religion. They married in 2012 and moved to Toronto together when Jayli won a songwriting contest. She dropped out of university to pursue a career in music. She has reconnected with her paternal family and indigenous heritage as an adult.

Discography

EPs

Singles

Music videos

Filmography

Film

Television

Awards and nominations

References

External links

Living people
Actresses from British Columbia
Bisexual actresses
Bisexual singers
Canadian people of Danish descent
Canadian people of First Nations descent
Canadian TikTokers
First Nations actresses
First Nations musicians
Former Jehovah's Witnesses
Canadian LGBT singers
LGBT First Nations people
Musicians from British Columbia
People from the Regional District of Central Kootenay
Saulteaux people
Year of birth missing (living people)